The Malaysian Ice Hockey League is the national ice hockey league in Malaysia. It was first contested in 2002.

Champions

2012: Asian Tigers Kuala Lumpur
2011: Asian Tigers Kuala Lumpur
2010: Kuala Lumpur Cobras
2009: Kuala Lumpur Cobras
2008: Kuala Lumpur Fangs
2007: Inferno Ice Kuala Lumpur
2006: Kuala Lumpur Wildcats
2005: Inferno Ice Kuala Lumpur
2004: Metro Wildcats
2003: Kuala Lumpur Blackhawks
2002: Kuala Lumpur Devils

References

External links
 Malaysian Ice Hockey Federation
 List of champions on internationalhockey.net

Ice hockey in Malaysia
Ice hockey leagues in Asia